The Signal is the weekly student newspaper of Ouachita Baptist University in Arkadelphia, Arkansas. The newspaper is published every Thursday during the academic year and is printed by the Hope Star.

The print edition has received the Gold Medalist rating from the Columbia Scholastic Press Association, and the online edition has received a Pacemaker award from the Associated Collegiate Press.

In 2013, The Signal was named runner-up by the Arkansas College Media Association for top newspaper and top website in the state.

History 
The first issue was printed in March 1890, making the publication the oldest university student journalistic effort in the state of Arkansas.

The Signal began as a combination newspaper/literary magazine known as the Ouachita Ripples, published monthly. On Sept. 22, 1917, the publication changed its name to Ouachita Baptist College Signal-Ripples. "Ripples" was later dropped and the publication became known as The Signal. The word "Signal" was chosen during the world war period because signals are what keep us together and fighting for the same cause, according to a letter in the first issue with the new name. The letter continued:

"The signal of Napoleon's drummer boy snatched victory out of defeat. The signal toward which every loyal American today looks is the flag of the United States. ...Just as the signal on the streams, bays, gulfs and seas are lights which bear those in ships away from the shoals, the rocks and the icebergs and lead them along safe paths of the deep to the sure harbor at the shore, so the Ouachita Signal is a light to those gliding along in the midst of societies toward the harbor of intelligence and cultural perfection."

The Signal's website, www.obusignal.com, launched in 2007, and an interactive eVersion of the newspaper launched in 2012.

Back issues of the newspaper are archived in Riley-Hickingbotham Library's Special Collections department.

References

Student newspapers published in Arkansas